The Redneck Manifesto may refer to:

 The Redneck Manifesto (band), instrumental rock band based in Dublin, Ireland, formed in 1998
 The Redneck Manifesto, a 1997 book by American author Jim Goad